Several large explosions occurred at the Saky airbase in the town of Novofedorivka, Crimea, on 9 August 2022, during the Russian invasion of Ukraine. The military base had been seized by Russian forces during the 2014 annexation of Crimea, part of the Russo-Ukrainian War. The explosions destroyed a number of Russian warplanes and caused substantial other damage. Ukrainian authorities tacitly took responsibility at first, until four weeks after the event, when Valerii Zaluzhnyi, Ukraine's military commander, explicitly said that it had been a Ukrainian missile strike.

Events 
A series of explosions occurred at Saky airbase on 9 August 2022. Initial reports were of four explosions. Later reports were of six or seven explosions, then up to 15, with reports that it sounded like ammunition detonating.

Russian authorities declared a state of emergency and yellow-alert level of terrorist threat, but claimed the explosions were the result of an accident, and said one person was killed, over a dozen injured, and 252 residents moved to temporary shelter due to damage to apartment blocks. On 10 August, the occupying authorities in Crimea announced that the number of people injured had increased to 13, and one person had died. On 12 August 2022, Anton Herashchenko, an advisor to Ukraine's Minister of Internal Affairs Denys Monastyrsky, claimed that 60 pilots and technicians had been killed and 100 people wounded in the explosions.

Ukrainian authorities did not explicitly take responsibility for the attack initially, but the General Staff of the Armed Forces said on 10 August that they had destroyed nine Russian planes in the preceding 24 hours. The Ukrainian Air Force said that 9 Russian aircraft were destroyed at the airbase.

Satellite images of the airbase before and after the explosions were released by Planet Labs on 10 August. The images showed significant damage to the base, with at least four large craters of similar size.

Outcomes 
The satellite images revealed at least eight aircraft, including Su-24 and Su-30, destroyed on the apron. According to Oryx group researchers, the images showed the losses as:

 5 Su-24
 3 Su-30SM
 2 Su-24 damaged
 1 Su-30SM damaged

According to the non-governmental Ukrainian Military Center:

 4 Su-24
 3 Su-30SM
 1 Su-30SM damaged
 3 Su-24s damaged

Of civil infrastructure, 62 high-rise buildings, 20 commercial facilities, and private houses were damaged. Many tourists left Crimea for Russia, and a Russian state media tourism website boasted of a record number of cars crossing the Crimean Bridge on 15 August.

Cause 
Shortly after the explosions, a senior Ukrainian military official said anonymously that Ukraine was responsible. The official would not say what type of weapon was used, but that it was "a device exclusively of Ukrainian manufacture".

Within a day of the explosions, a senior Ukrainian military official said anonymously that special forces and partisans were responsible. Former military operatives and analysts said that it was unlikely that individuals on the ground carried out the attack. According to former squadron leader of SEAL Team Six Chuck Pfarrer, "The craters visible in satellite photos are 10 meters across, ... And each is consistent with the explosion of at least 500 pounds of C4. No Special Forces team is going to drag a ton of C4 to a target when two ounces would be sufficient to destroy an aircraft".

Commentators speculated about various possible causes, with some assuming Ukraine had fired the American-made MGM-140 ATACMS missile, despite the claim that the weapon used was Ukrainian made, and despite U.S. denials that they had supplied ATACMS to Ukraine. There was speculation that Ukraine fired the Hrim-2 ballistic missile, which they had been developing for years, but many doubted it was ready for use or had a suitable GPS guidance system. Another possibility was the Ukrainian-made R-360 Neptune anti-ship cruise missile, but there were doubts about its accuracy in land-based targeting, plus the fact that a relatively slow moving cruise missile would probably have been observed, which did not happen. Some commentators suggested small loitering munitions, relying on their small warheads setting off large secondary explosions by hitting stored fuel or munitions.

On 7 September 2022, Ukrainian commander-in-chief Valerii Zaluzhnyi said that it had been a missile strike by Ukraine.

Notes

References 

Airstrikes conducted by Ukraine
Airstrikes during the 2022 Russian invasion of Ukraine
August 2022 events in Russia
August 2022 events in Ukraine
Events in Crimea
Explosions in 2022
Explosions in Ukraine
Explosions in Russia
Saky Raion